AKDIM (The Antalya Intercultural Dialogue Center, original Turkish: Antalya Kültürlerarası Dialog Merkezi), founded in 2005, is a non-profit organization in Antalya, Turkey which focuses on promoting intercultural dialog within and across different cultural backgrounds. AKDİM describes its mission as bringing people from a wide range of cultural backgrounds together to encourage dialogue, and to improve cross cultural awareness. It organizes a number of activities in varying disciplines from art to sport, trips to conferences. AKDİM receives operational funding from activity sponsors and member donations.

Platforms

KABİP
The Intercultural Togetherness Platform (Kültürlerarası Birliktelik Platformu) is aimed primarily at bringing together Turkish citizens and foreigners in Antalya. Activities to encourage this include "Tuesday tea", hiking, cooking club, information seminars, a Turkish course for foreigners, and theme and special occasions (Mother's Day, Easter, Noah's Pudding, etc.).

BİYAP
The Platform for Living Together (Birlikte Yaşama Platformu) aims to bring people together through culture, science and the arts. Activities include conferences and seminars, concerts, exhibitions, Turkish Language Olympiads, etc.

GEP
The Self-Improvement Platform (Geliştirme Platformu) is to encourage personal and career growth through organized activities like computer, language and speaking courses.

RESOP
The Relax and Outdoor Platform (Relax ve Spor Platformunda) organizes different sport and leisure activities like hunting, riding, etc.

Recognition
Thanks to its organizations, activities and events in number and quality, AKDİM has become a well-known organization in its area in Turkey and especially in Antalya. Many ministers and bureaucrats enjoy its activities.

Some of its events include:

 Impact of civil society on the democratization process, 'Hizmet' movement conference
 Civil Constitution Conference
 Does The 'Underground' Government Get Liquidation? Conference
 Universal Parameters of The Law and Human Rights Conference
 Turkish Language Olympiads Provincial Events (2009–2010 – 2011–2012)
 Dialog Fast Break (2011–2012)

Advisory committee
Erdoğan Çiğdem – Pedagogue 
Haşmet Öyken Gazeteci. 
tuncer çetinkaya ..
Prof. Helen Rose Ebaugh – Academician
Hasan Tarık Şen – Lawyer 
Prof. James C. Harrington – Academician
Ahmet Sözgen – Antalya University Secretary-General
Uğur Kepir – Pedagogue 
Prof. Alexander Scott – Academician
Prof. Martha Ann Kirk – Academician
Dr. Murat Kaplan – Academician

External links
www.akdim.org

References 

Culture in Antalya